Alicia's Diary is a short story written by Victorian novelist Thomas Hardy in 1887.  It is the diary of a girl named Alicia that is a tragic romance. The story was reprinted in the 1913 collection A Changed Man and Other Tales.

Plot
Her sister, Caroline, and their mother have gone to France, and eventually Alicia's suspicions are confirmed that Caroline has become engaged to an artist named Charles.  Charles keeps postponing the wedding.  Alicia's mother dies.  Due to the death of their mother and the coldness and procrastination of Charles to her, Caroline is dying.  Also, Alicia tries to leave them alone to catalyse the romantic process and to avoid charming Charles. Charles catches a glimpse of Alicia, and they soon fall in love with each other.  Needless to say, Alicia feels very guilty because of her incestuous feelings toward the fiancée of her sister.  Alicia and Charles make a deal that Charles should marry the dying Caroline, but not tell her it wasn't a legitimate marriage.  If Caroline dies, Alicia and Charles can be married.  If Caroline lives and does not want to marry Charles (after they tell her it wasn't a legitimate wedding), Alicia is free to marry Charles. The third option comes to pass, so Alicia must sacrifice her love for Charles and yield to her sister marrying Charles. Caroline and Charles marry.  Shortly following the wedding, Charles leaves and does not return.  Four months later, Alicia informs us that Charles drowned himself.  Five years later, Alicia adds a final note that Caroline married a man named Higham, who was the one who pretended to marry Caroline and Charles.  Alicia ends the short story by concluding that everyone involved in deceiving her sister have now repented (Higham by love, she says).  "[M]ay she be deceived no more."

External links
Full text of Alicia's Diary

1887 short stories
British short stories
Fictional diaries
Works by Thomas Hardy